Issei Sagawa is an EP by Gnaw Their Tongues, independently released on August 24, 2007. The album takes its name from Issei Sagawa, a Japanese man who murdered and cannibalized a Dutch woman named Renée Hartevelt in 1981. The music draws more from industrial music than previous work by Gnaw Their Tongues.

Track listing

Personnel
Adapted from the Issei Sagawa liner notes.
 Maurice de Jong (as Mories) – vocals, instruments, recording, cover art

Release history

References

External links 
 

2007 EPs
Gnaw Their Tongues albums